Dave or David Hansen may refer to:

David Hansen (playwright) (born 1968), American actor, director and playwright
Dave Hansen (politician) (born 1947), state senator from Wisconsin
Dave Hansen (baseball) (born 1968), former Major League Baseball third baseman
David Hansen (Norwegian politician) (born 1978), Norwegian politician for the Christian Democratic Party
David R. Hansen (born 1938), U.S. federal judge 
David Animle Hansen (1923–2008), first Ghanaian to be Chief of Naval Staff of the Ghana Navy
David Hansen (countertenor) (born 1981), Australian operatic countertenor

See also
David Hanssen (born 1976), Norwegian footballer
David Hanson (disambiguation)